Mayer Hersh MBE (31 August 1926 – 8 October 2016) was a Polish Jew who survived the Auschwitz concentration camp. Born in Sieradz to a family of six siblings, only Mayer and his brother Jakob survived. his father, mother and three other siblings were perished in Chełmno extermination camp

After World War II, Hersh lived in Manchester, England. He was awarded an MBE in the 2013 New Year Honours for services to Holocaust education.

Mayer died on 8 October 2016, at the age of 90.

See also
 List of victims and survivors of Auschwitz

References

1926 births
2016 deaths
Auschwitz concentration camp survivors
Members of the Order of the British Empire
People from Sieradz
Polish emigrants to the United Kingdom
British people of Polish-Jewish descent